Sir Christopher John Butcher styled The Hon Mr Justice Butcher, is a British High Court Judge.

Personal life and education 
Butcher was born on 14 August 1962 in Haslemere, Surrey. He was educated at Charterhouse School and Magdalen College, Oxford, where he read Modern History. He was elected a Prize Fellow of All Souls College, Oxford in 1983.

Butcher married Fiona Gaskin in 1992, whom he had two children with.

Butcher is Chairperson of the Oxford based charity, The Radcliffe Trust.

Career 
He was called to the Bar by Gray's Inn in 1986 and joined the London based chambers '7 King's Walk', specialising in shipping, banking, arbitration and Insurance. Butcher was appointed King's Counsel in 2001.

He would go on to become a Bencher for Gray's Inn in 2005, a Recorder in 2009, and a Deputy High Court Judge in 2013. He has been a Judge of the High Court of Justice (King's Bench Division) since 2018, he received the customary knighthood in 2019 form the late Queen Elizabeth II.

Alongside hearing High Court cases, Butcher is authorised to sit in the Competition Appeal Tribunal and Administrative court.

Awards and Scholarships 
He was awarded the Eldon Law Scholarship by the University of Oxford in 1987.

He achieved Chambers and Partners' Insurance Silk of the Year in 2008 and 2014.

Butcher was awarded a PhD by King's College London in 2019 for his thesis on Sir Thomas Noon Talfourd.

References 

21st-century English judges
20th-century English lawyers
Living people
1962 births